Near Westside Historic District is a national historic district located at Elmira in Chemung County, New York.  The district includes 480 principal structures over 25-30 blocks in a  district.  The district is predominantly residential with only about 15 percent of the structures having commercial or mixed commercial / residential use.  A full range of 19th and 20th century styles in domestic architecture is represented in the district.

It was listed on the National Register of Historic Places in 1983.

Gallery

References

http://www.historicnearwestside.com

Elmira, New York
Historic districts on the National Register of Historic Places in New York (state)
Historic districts in Chemung County, New York
National Register of Historic Places in Chemung County, New York